Endymion Porter (1587–1649) was an English diplomat and royalist.

Early life

He was descended from Sir William Porter, sergeant-at-arms to Henry VII, and son of Edmund Porter, of Aston-sub-Edge in Gloucestershire, by his cousin Angela, daughter of Giles Porter of Mickleton, in the same county.

He was brought up in Spain—where he had relatives—as page in the household of Olivares. He afterwards entered successively the service of Edward Villiers and of Buckingham, and through the latter's recommendation became groom of the bedchamber to Charles I.

In October 1622 he was sent to negotiate concerning the affairs of the Electorate of the Palatinate and the proposed "Spanish Match" of the Prince of Wales with the Infanta. He accompanied Charles and Buckingham on their foolhardy expedition in 1623, acted as their interpreter, and was included in the consequent attack made by Lord Bristol on Buckingham in 1626.

Career

In 1628, Porter was employed as envoy to Spain to negotiate for peace, and in 1634 on a mission to the Netherlands to the Cardinal-Infante Ferdinand.
He was one of the promoters of the 1635 Courteen association.

During the Civil War Porter remained a constant and faithful servant of the king. He was with him during the two Scottish campaigns, attended him again on the visit to Scotland in August 1641, and followed Charles on his last departure from London in 1642, receiving the nominal command of a regiment, and sitting in the Royalist parliament at Oxford in 1643.

He had, however, little faith in the king's measures. "His Majesty's businesses," he wrote in 1641, "run in their wonted channel—subtle designs of gaining the popular opinion and weak executions for the up-holding of monarchy." His fidelity to Charles was of a personal, not of a political nature. "My duty and loyalty have taught me to follow my king," he declared, "and by the grace of God nothing shall divert me from it." This devotion to the king, the fact that he was the agent and protégé of Buckingham, and that his wife Olivia, daughter of John Boteler, 1st Baron Boteler of Bramfield, and niece of Buckingham, was a zealous Roman Catholic, drew upon him the hostility of the opposite faction. Olivia was a lady-in-waiting to Queen consort Henrietta Maria.

As member of the Long Parliament, in which he sat as member for Droitwich, he was one of the minority of 59 who voted against Strafford's attainder, and was, in consequence, proclaimed a "betrayer of his country." 

He had been Captain of the St Martin-in-the-Fields company of the Westminster Trained Bands but was among the Royalist officers purged from the regiment on 24 January 1642 after a dispute over guarding the Houses of Parliament. 

On 15 February 1642, he was voted one of the dangerous counsellors, and specially excepted from pardon on 4 October and in the treaties of peace negotiated subsequently, while on 10 March 1643 he was excluded from parliament.

Abroad
Porter was also implicated in the army plot; he assisted Glamorgan in illegally putting the great seal to the commission to negotiate with the Irish in 1644, and was charged with having, in the same manner, affixed the great seal of Scotland, then temporarily in his keeping, to that of O'Neill in 1641, and of having incurred some responsibility for the Irish rebellion.

Towards the end of 1645, when the king's cause was finally lost, Porter abandoned England, and resided successively in France, Brussels and Antwerp, where he was reduced to great poverty, and the Netherlands. The property which he had accumulated during the tenure of his various appointments, by successful commercial undertakings and by favours of the court, was now for the most part either confiscated or encumbered.

He returned to England in 1649, after the king's death, and was allowed to compound for what remained of it. He died shortly afterwards, and was buried on 10 August 1649 at St Martin-in-the-Fields, leaving as a special charge in his will to his sons and descendants to "observe and respect the family of my Lord Duke of Buckingham, deceased, to whom I owe all the happiness I had in the world". He left five sons, George, James, Charles, Philip and Thomas, who all played conspicuous, if not all creditable, parts in the history of the time.

Arts

According to Wood, Porter was "beloved by two kings: James I for his admirable wit and Charles I for his general bearing, brave style, sweet temper, great experience, travels and modern languages". During the period of his prosperity, Porter had gained a great reputation in the world of art and letters. He wrote verses, was a generous patron of Davenant, who especially sang his praises, of Dekker, May, Herrick and Robert Dover, and was included among the 84 "essentials" in Edmund Bolton's "Academy Royal."

He was a judicious collector of pictures, and as the friend of Rubens, Van Dyck, Daniël Mijtens and other painters, and as agent for Charles in his purchases abroad he had a considerable share in forming the king's magnificent collection. He was also instrumental in procuring the Arundel pictures from Spain. In 2013 a painting of his wife by Anthony van Dyck was found to have been undiscovered as a masterpiece in the Bowes Museum in County Durham.

Sources
Life and Letters of Endymion Porter, by Dorothea Townshend (1897)
article in the Dictionary of National Biography, by CH Firth and authorities there cited
Memoires, by D Lloyd (1668), p. 657
Burton's Hist. of Scotland (1873), vi. 346–347
English Historical Review ii.531, 692
Gardiner's History of England
Lives of the Lords Strangford (1877), by E.B. de Fonblanque (Life and Letters)
Anthony à Wood, Athenae Oxonienses
Clarendon's History of the Rebellion
State Papers and Calendar of State Papers; Calendar of Slate Papers: Dom. and of Committee for Compounding
The Chesters of Chichele, by Waters, i.144–149
Eikon Basilike, by Ed. Almack, p. 94
There are also various references, etc., to Endymion Porter in Additional Charters, British Museum, 6223, 1633, 6225; Add. manuscripts 15,858; 33,374; and Egerton 2550, 2533; in the Hist. Manuscripts Comm. Series; Manuscripts of Duke of Portland, etc., and in Notes and Queries; also Thomason Tracts, Brit. Mus., E 118 (13).

References

1587 births
1649 deaths
17th-century philanthropists
Cavaliers
Court of James VI and I
Patrons of literature
17th-century English diplomats
English MPs 1640–1648
Middlesex Militia officers